Bill Roetzheim (August 7, 1928 – February 26, 2014) was an American gymnast. He competed at the 1948 Summer Olympics and the 1952 Summer Olympics. Roetzheim won gold at the 1951 Pan American Games, and he was also an army veteran who served in the Korean War.

Biography
Roetzheim was born in Chicago, Illinois, in 1928. His career in gymnastics began with the Southside Turners. From there, he attended the Navy Pier campus at the University of Illinois Chicago before going to Florida State University. At Florida State, he became the NCAA Men's Gymnastics All-Round Champion, and lead his school to win the team event. Later the same year, Roetzheim travelled to the 1951 Pan American Games in Buenos Aires at his own expense. At the games, he won two gold medals, in the individual all-around and horizontal bar, along with two silver medals, in the floor and pommel horse. During the 1940s and 1950s, Roetzheim went on to win seven AUU titles.

Roetzheim competed at two Olympic Games. At the 1948 Summer Olympics in London, he was part of the United States team that finished in seventh place in the team all-round event. Four years later, at the 1952 Summer Olympics in Helsinki, the US team finished in eighth place in the same event. He was also a judge at four consecutive Summer Olympics from 1984 to 1996.

In 1968, Roetzheim became the gymnastics coach at the University of Illinois, a post he held until 1973. The following year, he became the athletic director at the University. Roetzheim was inducted into the US Gymnastics Hall of Fame in 1975, the UIC Athletics Hall of Fame in 1990, the National Gymnastics Judges Association Hall of Fame and the Illinois High School Hall of Fame.

Roetzheim died in February 2014 in Plant City, Florida, at the age of 85.

References

External links
 

1928 births
2014 deaths
American male artistic gymnasts
Olympic gymnasts of the United States
Gymnasts at the 1948 Summer Olympics
Gymnasts at the 1952 Summer Olympics
Sportspeople from Chicago
Pan American Games medalists in gymnastics
Pan American Games gold medalists for the United States
Pan American Games silver medalists for the United States
Gymnasts at the 1951 Pan American Games
Medalists at the 1951 Pan American Games
Florida State Seminoles men's gymnasts